Pramiconazole is a triazole antifungal which was under development by Barrier Therapeutics for the treatment of acute skin and mucosal fungal infections but was never marketed.

References

Dioxolanes
Imidazolidinones
Isopropyl compounds
Lanosterol 14α-demethylase inhibitors
Organofluorides
Phenol ethers
para-Methoxyphenylpiperazines
Phenylethanolamine ethers
Triazole antifungals
Ureas